Charles T. Wells (born March 4, 1939) is a former member of the Florida Supreme Court from 1994 until March 3, 2009, when he retired.  He was appointed by Governor Lawton Chiles.  He served as chief justice from July 1, 2000, until June 30, 2002.

Wells presided over appeals brought to the Court as part of the dispute over Florida's electoral votes in the U.S. presidential election, 2000, which were broadcast live to a worldwide audience. Wells dissented from the majority opinion that ordered a recount to decide the presidential election.

He is the author of Inside Bush v. Gore, which was released in April 2013. It was the first book to be published by one of the judges at the center of the Bush v. Gore controversy.

He graduated from William R. Boone High School in 1957. Wells received his bachelor's degree from the University of Florida in 1961 and received his Juris Doctor degree from the University of Florida College of Law (now named the Levin College of Law) in 1964.

References

External links
Florida Supreme Court page on Charles T. Wells

University of Florida alumni
Chief Justices of the Florida Supreme Court
1939 births
Living people
People from Orlando, Florida
People from Windermere, Florida
Justices of the Florida Supreme Court
Fredric G. Levin College of Law alumni